Public Deb No. 1 (or Elsa Maxwell's Public Deb No. 1) is a 1940 American comedy film directed by Gregory Ratoff and starring George Murphy, Brenda Joyce and Ralph Bellamy.

Plot
A socialite is introduced to communism by her butler.

Partial cast

Production
The film's sets were designed by the art directors Richard Day and Rudolph Sternad.

References

Bibliography
 Dick, Bernard F. The Star-Spangled Screen: The American World War II Film. University Press of Kentucky, 2015.

External links
 

1940 films
1940 comedy films
American comedy films
Films directed by Gregory Ratoff
20th Century Fox films
American black-and-white films
1940s English-language films
1940s American films